Piirainen is a Finnish surname. Notable people with the surname include:

Elisabeth Piirainen (1943–2017), German linguist
Holly Piirainen (1983–1993), American murder victim
Jaakko Piirainen (1871–1917), Finnish master carpenter and politician
Raimo Piirainen (born 1952), Finnish politician

Finnish-language surnames